Ivan Herceg (born 10 February 1990 in Zagreb, SR Croatia, SFR Yugoslavia) is a Croatian professional footballer who currently plays for French club FCO Strasbourg Koenigshoffen 06.

Club career
Herceg came through youth ranks of Dinamo Zagreb and started his senior career at Dinamo Zagreb's affiliate Lokomotiva. During his first season he featured in 13 league matches for the club. The club was eventually promoted as the third-placed finisher and Herceg continued to play in the new top–flight club.

Career statistics

References

External links
List of national team appearances at official website of Croatian Football Federation
Profile at Nogometni Magazin

1990 births
Living people
Footballers from Zagreb
Association football defenders
Croatian footballers
Croatia youth international footballers
GNK Dinamo Zagreb players
NK Lokomotiva Zagreb players
NK Inter Zaprešić players
Maccabi Petah Tikva F.C. players
Puskás Akadémia FC players
Gyeongnam FC players
Seoul E-Land FC players
Croatian Football League players
Israeli Premier League players
Nemzeti Bajnokság I players
K League 2 players
Championnat National 3 players
Croatian expatriate footballers
Expatriate footballers in Israel
Croatian expatriate sportspeople in Israel
Expatriate footballers in Hungary
Croatian expatriate sportspeople in Hungary
Expatriate footballers in South Korea
Croatian expatriate sportspeople in South Korea
Expatriate footballers in France
Croatian expatriate sportspeople in France